The Swedish Federation for Voluntary Defence Education and Training Merit Badge (FöutbGFt) awarded by the Swedish Federation for Voluntary Defence Education and Training and its predecessors since 1953. Its awarded for meritorious contributions within the Swedish Federation for Voluntary Defence Education and Training's area of activity.

History
The badge, originally called the Swedish Central Federation for Voluntary Military Training Merit Badge (CFBGFt), was established on 8 May 1953. In 2006 it was renamed the Swedish Federation for Voluntary Defence Education and Training Merit Badge (FöutbGFt), in connection with the Swedish Central Federation for Voluntary Military Training changing its name to the Swedish Federation for Voluntary Defence Education and Training.

Appearance

Badge
The badge consists of a 36 mm high and 31 mm wide openwork badge corresponding to the 8th size. The obverse consists of an oval stylized wreath with the Swedish Federation for Voluntary Defence Education and Training's heraldic arms (azure, a cross on a chief azure fesswise three open crowns or) resting on two swords crossed over the wreath. The reverse is smooth.

Ribbon
The ribbon is 35 mm wide and made of quilted silk. It has a blue moiré pattern with a 3 mm wide yellow stripe in the middle.

Criteria
The badge is awarded to Swedish or foreign citizens in recognition of meritorious contributions within the Swedish Federation for Voluntary Defence Education and Training's area of activity for, as a rule, 5 years. As a rule, the person in question should have previously been awarded their own federation's silver medal (equivalent) and the badge is usually awarded no earlier than 3 years thereafter. A maximum of 60 badges should be awarded per financial year.

See also
Swedish Federation for Voluntary Defence Education and Training Medal of Merit

References

Notes

Print

Orders, decorations, and medals of Sweden
Awards established in 1953
1953 establishments in Sweden